The All-Stars were a short-lived English blues combo active in the early-mid 1960s. Originally known as the Cyril Davies (R&B) All-Stars, their later recordings are often credited to the Immediate All-Stars due to their releases on Immediate Records. In 1999, the group reformed as the Carlo Little All-Stars.

History

The Cyril Davies R&B All-Stars
The All-Stars were initially formed as a backing band for vocalist and blues harmonica player Cyril Davies after his departure from Alexis Korner's Blues Incorporated in October 1962. The original lineup was tentatively named 'The Cyril Davies Blues Band' and was made up of former members of Screaming Lord Sutch's group, the Savages, including Nicky Hopkins on piano, Carlo Little on drums and Ricky Fenson (aka Rick Brown) on bass. The band also featured Jimmy Page on guitar for a brief period, though he soon backed out to focus on his burgeoning career as a session musician and was replaced by Bernie Watson, another former member of the Savages.

In December 1962, Davies was in competition with Korner to recruit Long John Baldry as a second lead vocalist. Baldry had previously performed with Blues Incorporated while Davies was still a member, with both vocalists being featured on the 1962 album R&B from the Marquee. Following the formation of the All-Stars, Baldry played a few shows with each band before eventually committing to join Davies' camp in January 1963.

Around this time, Davies also added female backing singers to the lineup in the form of South African vocal group the Velvettes (not to be confused with Motown trio, the Velvelettes), who had emigrated to England after touring with the musical stage production King Kong. The Velvettes were initially a quartet made up of Peggy Phango, Hazel Futa, Patience Gcwabe and Eunice Mamsie Mthombeni, though Phango soon departed to pursue a solo career, leaving the rest of the group to join the All-Stars as a trio.

On 27 February, the All-Stars recorded their first single for Pye Records: the original compositions "Country Line Special" and "Chicago Calling", released under the name 'Cyril Davies and His Rhythm and Blues All-Stars'. However, Baldry and the Velvettes are not featured on these recordings.

 In May 1963, illness forced the departure of Hopkins as he was hospitalised for several months. Former Blues Incorporated pianist Keith Scott was recruited in his stead, but growing tensions between Davies and the other band members meant that Fenson, Watson and Little each soon left the group to be replaced by bassist Cliff Barton, guitarist Geoff Bradford and drummer Micky Waller.

In August, this lineup recorded the R&B All-Stars' second single for Pye: "Preachin' the Blues", a Robert Johnson cover, and "Sweet Mary", a Lead Belly cover. As with the previous recordings, Baldry and the Velvettes are not featured. Instead, backing vocals for "Preachin' the Blues" are provided by Alex Bradford and Madeline Bell. Towards the end of 1963, Scott and Waller were themselves replaced by the group's final members Johnny Parker and Bob Wackett.

Cyril Davies died on 7 January 1964 of pleurisy and endocarditis. Following this, Pye Records paid tribute to Davies by re-releasing the four tracks he had recorded for them as the EP The Sound of Cyril Davies and His Rhythm and Blues All-Stars.

Baldry assumed the role of band leader, and with fellow All-Stars Barton, Bradford and Parker went on to perform as 'The Hoochie Coochie Men' together with Rod Stewart on vocals and Ernie O'Malley on drums. Carlo Little also joined them briefly in June 1964, but soon left due to "a difference in musical opinion" between himself and Baldry. The Hoochie Coochie Men released one album, Long John's Blues, before disbanding in October 1965. Baldry and Stewart went on to form Steampacket with former All-Stars Ricky Fenson and Micky Waller.

At least one further song is known to have been recorded by the All-Stars during Davies' lifetime: a cover of Little Walter's "Someday Baby", first issued by Immediate Records on the 1968 compilation album Blues Anytime Vol. 3. This track was credited to 'Cyril Davies and the All-Stars', although it is not clear when the recording was made, nor with which lineup. In 1986 a sixth track was released: a cover of Buddy Holly's "Not Fade Away" on the Castle Communications compilation album White Boy Blues Vol. 2, again credited to 'Cyril Davies and the All-Stars'.

The All-Stars featuring Jeff Beck
By 1965, Jimmy Page had established himself as a prolific session musician and was signed to Immediate Records as an in-house producer. Around eighteen months after Cyril Davies' death, Page brought together former All-Stars Nicky Hopkins, Carlo Little and Cliff Barton to record with him and his friend Jeff Beck. Together they recorded five original tracks, with Hopkins taking the lead on "Piano Shuffle", Beck on "Chuckles" and "Steelin'", and Page on "Down in the Boots" and "L.A. Breakdown".

The first track from this session to be issued was "Steelin'", although its initial release was not credited to the group. London fashion photographer David Anthony (under the pseudonym 'Charles Dickens') had recorded a cover of The Rolling Stones' "So Much in Love" for Immediate Records, and when this was released as a single in 1965 it featured "Steelin'" as its b-side under the title "Our Soul Brother TH", credited solely to Dickens. The rest of the tracks from this session would eventually get their first release in 1968, alongside "Steelin'", properly credited to 'The All-Stars featuring...' on the Immediate compilation album Blues Anytime Vol. 3.

Page, Clapton and the Immediate All-Stars
In June 1965, Jimmy Page invited Eric Clapton to join him in a jam session at his home studio on Miles Road in London, and the two guitarists recorded seven instrumental tracks together: "Choker", "Draggin' My Tail", "Freight Loader", "Miles Road", "Snake Drive", "Tribute to Elmore" and "West Coast Idea". Page and Clapton were both of the opinion that the tracks they recorded were merely rehearsals rather than fully formed songs, but representatives of Immediate Records soon approached Page informing him that they legally owned the publishing rights to all recordings he made as per the terms of their contract. Page reluctantly gave them the recordings of the jam session in fear of a lawsuit and was asked to clean them up by adding overdubs, which he recorded that August at Olympic Studios with a new lineup of the All-Stars. This time, the group featured members of The Rolling Stones: Mick Jagger, Bill Wyman, Ian Stewart and Charlie Watts (credited as Chris Winters), facilitated by the Stones' manager at the time also being Immediate Records' co-founder, Andrew Loog Oldham. This was seen by Clapton as a betrayal of confidence on Page's part, and greatly damaged the personal relationship between the two guitarists for years to follow.

Immediate Records first released these tracks alongside the All-Stars' previous recordings in 1968, spread out across their compilation albums Blues Anytime Vol. 1–3. The tracks were initially attributed simply to Eric Clapton, or 'Eric Clapton and Jimmy Page', although many subsequent releases have given the credit to 'The Immediate All-Stars'.

The Carlo Little All-Stars
In late 1962, the Rolling Stones were beginning to gain a following as a new band on the London blues scene. At the time, the band consisted of vocalist Mick Jagger, guitarists Keith Richards and Brian Jones, and pianist Ian Stewart. The group played with a number of different bassists and drummers during this period, including members of the Cyril Davies All-Stars Carlo Little and Ricky Fenson. Little and Fenson made a strong impression on the younger musicians, and were repeatedly asked to join the band, but the Stones at the time couldn't afford to match what they were earning with the All-Stars. After finally recruiting permanent bassist Bill Wyman in December 1962 and drummer Charlie Watts in January 1963, the Stones played a support slot for the All-Stars for about a month, with Little and Fenson continuing to occasionally fill in for Watts and Wyman whenever the latter two were unavailable to play.

Decades later, in March 1998, Little was interviewed by Mojo magazine about his time playing with the Rolling Stones, which led to several more interviews and a TV documentary being produced for Channel 5. Little flew to Paris for the documentary, where he was reunited with the Stones, meeting them backstage at one of their shows and being invited to attend Jagger's 55th birthday party at their hotel.

Capitalising on the attention and publicity he was now receiving, Little reformed the All-Stars in 1999 with Fenson on bass and including vocalist Art Wood, guitarist Alex Chanter, Eddie Armer playing harmonica and Johnny Casanova on keyboards. They recorded an album together in 2001, named Never Stop Rockin, which also featured Ronnie Wood, Jeff Beck, Long John Baldry, Matthew Fisher and the Chanter Sisters, though this remained unreleased for several years.Confessions of a Sixties Drummer: Discography at carlolittle.com (archived from 2012)

Carlo Little died of lung cancer on 6 August 2005. The Carlo Little All-Stars' album Never Stop Rockin was released posthumously by Angel Air Records in January 2009.

Personnel

1962–1964
Cyril Davies and the R&B All-StarsNote: Dates represented here are approximate, accurate only to within a month.

Cyril Davies – vocals, harmonica 
Jimmy Page – guitar 
Nicky Hopkins – piano 
Ricky Fenson, aka Rick Brown – bass 
Carlo Little – drums 
Bernie Watson – guitar 
Long John Baldry – vocals 
The Velvettes – backing vocals 
Hazel Futa, Patience Gcwabe, Eunice Mamsie Mthombeni

Keith Scott – piano 
Cliff Barton – bass 
Micky Waller – drums 
Geoff Bradford – guitar 
Johnny Parker – piano 
Bob Wackett – drums 

Timeline

1965

The All-Stars featuring Jeff Beck
Jimmy Page – guitar, production
Jeff Beck – guitar
Nicky Hopkins – piano
Cliff Barton – bass
Carlo Little – drums

The Immediate All-Stars
Jimmy Page – guitar, production
Eric Clapton – guitar 
Mick Jagger – harmonica 
Ian Stewart – piano 
Bill Wyman – bass 
Charlie Watts, credited as Chris Winters – drums

1999–2002
The Carlo Little All-Stars
Carlo Little – drums, band leader
Art Wood – vocals
Alex Chanter – guitar, vocals
Eddie Armer – harmonica
Johnny Casanova – keyboards
Ricky Fenson – bass

Discography

Pye Records
All releases credited to Cyril Davies and His Rhythm and Blues All-Stars.

Immediate Records
Listed here is only the initial release of each track recorded by the All-Stars. Following Immediate Records going out of business in 1970, these tracks have been released on many compilation albums by multiple record labels, major and independent.

Castle Communications

 It has been suggested that this track was in fact recorded by Dave Berry and the Cruisers and misattributed to Davies.

Angel Air Records
Carlo Little All-Stars.

References

External links
The All-Stars at Discogs

Jimmy Page
Eric Clapton
The Rolling Stones
The Yardbirds
Blues music supergroups
British supergroups
English blues musical groups
English blues rock musical groups
English session musicians
Musical groups from London
Musical groups established in 1962
Musical groups disestablished in 1965
Articles which contain graphical timelines
1962 establishments in England
1965 disestablishments in England